The BUT 9641T was a three-axle double deck trolleybus chassis manufactured by British United Traction between 1947 and 1956. A total of 498 were manufactured for eight operators in England at Leyland's Ham, AEC's Southall and Crossley Motors' Stockport factories.

References

British United Traction
Trolleybuses
Vehicles introduced in 1947